Masamichi (written 正道, 正通, 正則, 正路, 政通, 昌道, 誠道 or 将道) is a masculine Japanese given name. Notable people with the name include:

Masamichi Abe, Japanese video game director
, Japanese composer
, Japanese footballer
, Japanese daimyō
, Japanese interior designer
, Japanese long-distance runner
, Japanese politician and lawyer
Masamichi Kuriyama, Japanese handball player
, Japanese aikidoka
, Japanese noble
, Japanese mathematician
, Imperial Japanese Navy admiral
, Japanese footballer
, Japanese businessman and banker
, Japanese cyclist

Japanese masculine given names